Amber Patrice Riley (born February 15, 1986), sometimes known mononymously as RILEY,  is an American actress and singer. She is best known for her portrayal of Mercedes Jones on the Fox comedy-drama series Glee (2009–2015). For her performance on the series, she and the rest of the cast won a Screen Actors Guild Award, and have been nominated for three Teen Choice Awards, three NAACP Image Awards, and a Grammy Award.

In 2016, Riley originated the lead role of Effie White in the West End debut of Dreamgirls. She won the Laurence Olivier Award for Best Actress in a Musical and Evening Standard Theatre Award for Best Musical Performance in 2017 for her work.

Riley won season 17 of Dancing with the Stars in 2013. In 2017, Riley appeared as a judge on BBC One musical theatre talent show Let It Shine and formed a musical theatre supergroup with Beverley Knight and Cassidy Janson, known collectively as Leading Ladies and signed to East West Records/Warner. Her debut album, Songs from the Stage, was released on November 17, 2017. She participated on the American and British versions of The Masked Singer.

Early life
Riley was born in Los Angeles County, California, with a mother of the maiden name Hightower. She has two older sisters, Toiya and Ashley. Riley auditioned for American Idol when she was 17 years old, during the show's second season, but was turned down by the producers. She graduated from La Mirada High School in La Mirada, California in 2004.

Career

2009–2019: Breakthrough with Glee and other appearances

In 2008, Riley was cast in the role of Mercedes Jones on the comedy-drama television series Glee, and appeared as a main cast member for all but one of the six seasons—she received guest star credit during season 5. Riley performed numerous solos throughout the series' run, including "Respect", "Bust Your Windows", "Hate on Me", "And I Am Telling You I'm Not Going", "Beautiful", "Bridge over Troubled Water", "I Look to You", "Ain't No Way", "Try a Little Tenderness", "Spotlight", "All I Want for Christmas Is You" and, three days after Whitney Houston's death, performed a tribute version of "I Will Always Love You". She also played Dr. Frank-N-Furter in the episode "The Rocky Horror Glee Show", singing the lead on the song "Sweet Transvestite" to generally positive reviews from critics. For her role as Mercedes Jones, Riley won a Screen Actors Guild Award and received nominations for three NAACP Image Awards and three Teen Choice Awards.

Riley appeared at the 2010 MTV Video Music Awards and later sang the national anthem at the 2012 Democratic National Convention. She also co-wrote a track titled "Leave a Light On" for British group The Saturdays, which is featured on their album Living for the Weekend. In January 2014, Riley and her sister Ashley launched a plus size online clothing boutique, Rileyland Fashions. She also models the garments. Riley's debut single, "Colorblind", premiered live on April 3, 2014, on The Queen Latifah Show. The song was written by Emeli Sandé, Claude Kelly and Steve Mac, and was released as a digital download on April 8, 2014. It was expected to be the lead single off her debut album. The song was also performed by Riley on Glee. In 2015, it was reported that Riley would star in a Christmas television film, her first movie role, and her first acting role, since Glee. In December 2015, she portrayed Addaperle, the Good Witch of the North, in NBC's live performance of The Wiz. In February 2016, it was announced that Riley would portray the lead role of Effie White in Dreamgirls, at the Savoy Theatre in London's West End, beginning performances in November 2016. Riley recorded a number of tracks for Todrick Hall's visual album Straight Outta Oz. Also in 2016 she performed the national anthem at the second game of the 2016 NHL Stadium Series featuring the Detroit Red Wings and Colorado Avalanche at Coors Field.

In 2017, Riley teamed up with British singers Beverley Knight and Cassidy Janson to form a musical theatre supergroup, known collectively as the Leading Ladies. Their debut album, Songs from the Stage, was released on November 17, 2017 and features covers songs from Cats, Beautiful and Rent among others.

In 2019, she took on the role of Audrey II, the carnivorous singing plant, in Little Shop of Horrors at Pasadena Playhouse.

Dancing with the Stars
In 2013, Riley won the seventeenth season of ABC's dancing competition Dancing with the Stars. She was partnered with the show's one and only six-time champion, Derek Hough. Riley and Hough tied the record for highest first-week score of 27, received 5 perfect scores of 30, and only received a score lower than 8 one time. Riley is the first African-American woman to win Dancing With the Stars.

Performances

2020–present: RILEY
On February 28, 2020, Riley confirmed she finished recording songs for her debut extended play. Following her Jimmy Kimmel Live! performance on August 28 it was announced her EP would be released on October 2. She later confirmed she would be performing under the name "Riley" (stylized in all caps as "RILEY") and released the single "A Moment" on September 4. "BGE" (initialism for big girl energy) was released as the second single from the EP on September 18, alongside its music video. The EP was released on October 2, 2020, featuring a total of six tracks. On October 8, 2020 she released a music video for the track "Creepin'".

In 2022, Riley competed on season eight of The Masked Singer as "Harp"; she won the season. In 2023, she competed as "Jellyfish" on the fourth season of The Masked Singer UK and finished in fourth place.

Filmography

Stage

Discography

Extended plays

Singles

Guest appearances

Soundtrack appearances

 Glee: The Music, Volume 1 (2009)
 Glee: The Music, Volume 2 (2009)
 Glee: The Music, The Power of Madonna (2010)
 Glee: The Music, Volume 3 Showstoppers (2010)
 Glee: The Music, Journey to Regionals (2010)
 Glee: The Music, The Complete Season One (2010)
 Glee: The Music, Best of Season One (2010)
 Glee: The Music, The Rocky Horror Glee Show (2010)
 Glee: The Music, The Christmas Album(2010)
 Glee: The Music, Volume 4 (2010)
 Glee: The Music, Love Songs (2010)
 Glee: The Music, Volume 5 (2011)
 Glee: The Music, Volume 6 (2011)
 Glee: The 3D Concert Movie (Motion Picture Soundtrack) (2011)
 Glee: The Music, Dance Party (2011)
 Glee: The Music, The Christmas Album Volume 2 (2011)
 Glee: The Music, Volume 7 (2011)
 Glee: The Music, The Graduation Album (2012)
 Glee: The Music, The Complete Season Two (2012)
 Glee: The Music, The Complete Season Three (2012)
 Glee: The Music Presents Glease (2012)
 Glee: The Quarterback (2013)
 Glee: The Music, The Complete Season Four (2014)
 Glee: The Music - Celebrating 100 Episodes (2014)
 Glee: The Music, Bash (2014)
 Glee: The Music, Tested (2014)
 Glee: The Music, Opening Night (2014)
 Glee: The Music, The Back Up Plan (2014)
 Glee: The Music, Old Dog, New Tricks (2014)
 Glee: The Music, The Untitled Rachel Barry Project (2014)
 Glee: The Music, Homecoming (2015)
 Glee: The Music, What the World Needs Now is Love (2015)
 Glee: The Music, Transitioning (2015)
 Glee: The Music, A Wedding (2015)
 Glee: The Music, 2009 (2015)
 Glee: The Music, Dreams Come True (2015)
 The Wiz Live! (2015)
 Crazy Ex-Girlfriend (Season 1, Vol. 2) (2016)
 Dreamgirls (Original London Cast Recording) (2017)
 The Little Mermaid Live! (2019)

Awards and nominations

References

External links

 

1986 births
21st-century American singers
21st-century American actresses
Activists from Los Angeles
Actresses from Los Angeles
African-American actresses
African-American women singers
American Idol participants
American sopranos
American stage actresses
American television actresses
Dancing with the Stars (American TV series) winners
Living people
Masked Singer winners
Schoolboy Records artists
Singers from Los Angeles
Laurence Olivier Award winners
21st-century American women singers
Leading Ladies (group) members